Apirana Taylor (born 15 March 1955) is a New Zealand poet, novelist, performer, story-teller, musician and painter.

Biography
Born in Wellington 15 March 1955, Apirana Taylor is of Pākehā and Māori descent with affiliations to Ngāti Porou, Te Whānau-ā-Apanui and Ngāti Ruanui. He was a prominent member of the Māori theatre cooperative Te Ohu Whakaari alongside his brother Rangimoana Taylor and playwright sister Riwia Brown.  Plays of Taylors that Te Ohu Whakaari presented included Kohanga about the kohanga reo movement of Māori language revival and Te Whānau a Tuanui Jones. Kohanga was awarded 'best debut play' by the Dominion Post.

Taylor has published three volumes of poetry – Eyes of the Ruru (1979), Soft Leaf Falls of the Moon (1997) and Te Ata Kura; the red-tipped dawn (2004); three short-story collections; a novel, He Tangi Aroha (1993); and two plays. He was a runner-up for the Pegasus Book Award in 1985, for He Rau Aroha: A Hundred Leaves of Love.

Taylors play Whaea Kairau: Mother Hundred Eater (1995) first produced by Taki Rua is described as a 'seminal Maori theatre work'. The play is an epic story set in the late 1840s in New Zealand, the central character is a dispossessed Irish woman and family.

Poetry by Taylor was included in UPU, a curation of Pacific Island writers’ work which was first presented at the Silo Theatre as part of the Auckland Arts Festival in March 2020. UPU was remounted as part of the Kia Mau Festival in Wellington in June 2021.

Works
 3 shades, poetry by Apirana Taylor, Lindsay Rabbitt, L.E. Scott; with an introduction by Alan Loney, Wellington: Voice Press, 1981
 Ki te ao: new stories, Penguin Books, 1990
Te ata kura = The red tipped dawn, Canterbury University Press, 2004
A Canoe in Midstream, poetry, Canterbury University Press, 2009
Five Strings, novel, Anahera Press, May 2017

Notes

References
Apirana Taylor (2004). Te Ata Kura, the red-tipped dawn, a collection of poetry by Apirana Taylor. Canterbury University Press.
New Zealand Book Council profile
New Zealand Electronic Poetry Centre profile

1956 births
Living people
Musicians from Wellington
New Zealand male novelists
People from Wellington City
New Zealand Māori writers
20th-century New Zealand novelists
21st-century New Zealand novelists
20th-century New Zealand painters
20th-century New Zealand male writers
21st-century New Zealand male writers
Ngāti Porou people
Te Whānau-ā-Apanui people
Ngāti Ruanui people